Naftali Tamir (Hebrew: נפתלי תמיר) is an Israeli diplomat who has served as Ambassador to Australia and the non-resident ambassador to New Zealand from 2005 until 2007.  Tamir was recalled after an interview where “he said Israel and Australia are "like sisters" because both are in Asia and their peoples do not have "yellow skin and slanted eyes".”. Tamir denied making the comments.  He was later cleared by the Foreign Ministry.

From 1999 until 2000, he was Ambassador to Finland.

References

Ambassadors of Israel to Finland
Ambassadors of Israel to Australia
Ambassadors of Israel to New Zealand
Year of birth missing (living people)
Living people